Jennifer Wade (born October 6, 1980) is an American actress known for playing Liz Traynor on the Fox television series The Good Guys, Nina in The CW television series Reaper, and the character of Honey Pie in the Feast film trilogy.

Life and career
Wade was born in Eugene, Oregon. She moved to Los Angeles to pursue her acting career in 1998.

In 1999, she debuted on television in the MTV anthology series Undressed. After Neil LaBute recruited her to star opposite Aaron Eckhart in his 10-minute film Tumble, the filmmaker offered her an uncredited role in his 2000 comedy film, Nurse Betty, starring Renée Zellweger. Following her film debut, Wade returned to television, guest starring in an October 2000 episode of the syndicated nonfiction TV program Arrest & Trial and in a January 2003 episode of the comedy series 8 Simple Rules for Dating My Teenage Daughter. She was also cast in the 2003 ABC pilot Naked Hotel starring John Corbett, which was not picked up to series; Wade played the assistant manager at the fictional Hotel de Bleu, a Bahamas hideaway.

Wade returned to the film in 2005, playing Jane Fonda's young replacement in Robert Luketic's romantic comedy film Monster-in-Law, which co-starred Jennifer Lopez and Michael Vartan. That same year, Wade appeared in several other films: Wes Craven's drama/thriller Red Eye with Rachel McAdams, Harold Ramis's neo-noir/comedy-drama The Ice Harvest, and the Rob Reiner comedy Rumor Has It with Jennifer Aniston, Kevin Costner, and Shirley MacLaine. Also in 2005 Wade appeared in John Gulager's horror film Feast, which received a limited theatrical release in the United States in September 2006, playing the role of waitress Honey Pie. Wade reprised her role as Honey Pie in the second film and a cameo in the third film.

In 2006, Wade co-starred with John Patrick Amedori, Lizzy Caplan and Daryl Hannah in Elliott Lester's teen drama, Love Is the Drug, playing the role of "haughty" private school student Erin. In 2007, she played the role of sous-chef Leah in No Reservations, Scott Hicks’s remake of the German comedy Mostly Martha, starring Catherine Zeta-Jones and Aaron Eckhart. In 2009 Wade appeared in the film The Strip playing the role of "free-spirited" Melissa.

In 2009, Wade joined the cast of The CW comedy series Reaper playing the recurring role of the demon Nina. Earlier the same year she was cast on Body Politic, a well-received CW pilot that was not picked up to series, playing the part of Ruby, "an idealistic young staffer".

In 2010, she was cast as Assistant District Attorney Liz Traynor on the short-lived Fox buddy-cop series The Good Guys (originally titled Jack and Dan) alongside Colin Hanks and Bradley Whitford.  In 2011, Wade was cast on the 2012–13 TBS comedy series Wedding Band, playing the role of Rachel the love interest of Brian Austin Green's character.

Personal life
Wade became engaged to actor Robert Buckley in March 2018. In May 2018, the couple announced that they had married.

Filmography

Film

Television

References

External links
 
 

1980 births
American film actresses
American television actresses
Living people
Actresses from Eugene, Oregon
20th-century American actresses
21st-century American actresses
Winston Churchill High School (Eugene, Oregon) alumni